The fourth series of the children's television series Hi-5 aired between 15 July 2002 and 13 September 2002 on the Nine Network in Australia. The series was produced by Kids Like Us for Nine with Kris Noble as executive producer.

Cast

Presenters
 Kellie Crawford – Word Play
 Kathleen de Leon Jones – Puzzles and Patterns
 Nathan Foley – Shapes in Space
 Tim Harding – Making Music
 Charli Robinson  – Body Move

Episodes

Home video releases

Awards and nominations

References

External links
 Hi-5 Website

2002 Australian television seasons